WFRV-TV (channel 5) is a television station in Green Bay, Wisconsin, United States, affiliated with CBS. Owned by Nexstar Media Group, the station maintains studios on East Mason Street in Green Bay, and its transmitter is located north of Morrison, Wisconsin.

WFRV-TV's studios also house master control and some internal operations for MyNetworkTV affiliate WJMN-TV (channel 3) in Escanaba, Michigan, which served as a semi-satellite of WFRV for the central Upper Peninsula of Michigan until 2022; WJMN does maintain studios, sales offices and engineering operations in Marquette.

History

WNAM-TV and VHF merger
WNAM-TV began telecasting from Neenah on UHF channel 42 on January 26, 1954, after beginning test transmissions in December 1953. Owned by the Neenah-Menasha Broadcasting Company alongside radio station WNAM (1280 AM), the station carried programming from ABC as well as occasional NBC and DuMont programs.

By late 1954, northeastern Wisconsin had one UHF television station—WNAM-TV—and two VHF outlets, WBAY-TV channel 2 and new sign-on WMBV-TV channel 11. The UHF station was struggling; WOSH-TV of Oshkosh had closed down in March. The FCC had awarded the third and final commercial channel for Green Bay, channel 5, to the Valley Telecasting Company, a consortium of 17 area leaders, in 1953. Sensing that the arrival of Valley Telecasting, which had selected the call letters WFRV-TV for its station to represent the "Wonderful Fox River Valley", would doom its UHF channel to oblivion, Neenah-Menasha reached a deal in November to merge with Valley and announced it would suspend operations of WNAM-TV on the evening of January 2, 1955. The combined station would retain some operations at Neenah for program production in the Fox Cities, but it would use the tower and transmitter building of the former WJPG-FM on Scray's Hill near De Pere.

WFRV-TV signed on channel 5 on May 20, 1955, after an appeal lodged by WMBV-TV to block the merger of Valley Telecasting and Neenah-Menasha was declined for the final time; the station aired film programming for its first ten days before beginning affiliations with ABC and the DuMont Television Network—then on its way out—on June 1. While the transmitter facility was new, WFRV-TV used WNAM-TV's Neenah studios. By 1956, Neenah-Menasha owned all of WFRV-TV; that same year, the company announced plans to build a studio base in Green Bay. Master control switched to Green Bay in December when a new tower and transmitter building were activated, and production from the station's present Mason Street studios began in mid-January 1957.

WFRV-TV was the Green Bay station in the short-lived Badger Television Network, which operated in 1958 and also included Milwaukee's WISN-TV and Madison's WKOW-TV. The next year, on February 1, the station changed affiliations from ABC to NBC. Later that year, the station broadcast what was claimed to be the first ever coverage of a live lunar eclipse: a studio camera was wheeled out into the station parking lot.

Orion Broadcasting ownership
In December 1960, Valley Telecasting sold WFRV-TV to Valley Broadcasting Company, a subsidiary of WAVE-TV at Louisville, Kentucky, for $1.09 million. WFRV's first attempt at expanding to the Upper Peninsula, a construction permit to build channel 8 at Iron Mountain, Michigan, was scrapped at the company's request days after the sale, as was an application by the company to build a channel 9 station at Wausau.

Local programming began to be broadcast in color in the fall of 1965, making it the second station (behind WBAY-TV) with that capability in the market. Two years later, the station began its move to build a satellite in the Upper Peninsula when it filed for channel 3 at Escanaba, Michigan on June 20, 1967. As a result of an attempt by Northern Michigan University to build an educational station on the wider-coverage channel 3 instead of the allocated channel 13, it would be nearly two years before a construction permit was granted on April 23, 1969. From a transmitter site near Trenary, WJMN-TV—so designated in honor of Jane Morton Norton, chairman of the board of the company—began broadcasting October 7, bringing a full NBC lineup and WFRV-TV's signal to a further 50,000 households.

Midwest ownership
Orion Broadcasting reached a deal to merge with Cosmos Broadcasting, a subsidiary of the Liberty Corporation, in 1980. The merger would put the combined company over the limit for the number of VHF television stations it could own, prompting it to immediately announce that it would divest WFRV/WJMN. In January 1981, Cosmos found a buyer: Midwest Radio-Television, owners of WCCO radio and television in Minneapolis. The transaction closed in October.

After taking over, Midwest made $1 million in major investments in new equipment, including a news helicopter. An even larger change was in the offing. On October 25, 1982, the station announced it would end its 23-year association with NBC and return to the then-stronger ABC in 1983, after ABC began courting channel 5, which had been one of NBC's strongest affiliates. One potential complication emerged when it was discovered that WFRV's affiliation agreement had just been automatically renewed through February 1985. It was not until March 1983 that outgoing ABC outlet WLUK-TV and NBC reached an affiliation deal, which allowed the switch to take place on April 18.

CBS purchase and affiliation switch
On July 23, 1991, CBS announced that it would purchase the entirety of Midwest Communications, Inc. The deal gave the company WCCO radio and television in Minneapolis, but it also gave CBS an ABC affiliate—WFRV/WJMN—in a market smaller than any in which the company was operating. In the immediate aftermath of the $200 million acquisition, the network sent out mixed messages: CBS executive Peter Lund said the company had decided to keep the Green Bay station, yet an affiliate relations official told longtime CBS affiliate WBAY-TV that the network would be interested in remaining there if a buyer were to be found.

The sale dislodged the existing CBS affiliates in the Green Bay and Marquette markets, WBAY-TV and WLUC-TV. The switch in Green Bay took place March 15, 1992—just over a month after CBS closed on the Midwest purchase—with WBAY becoming the ABC outlet. In Marquette, where CBS angered WLUC-TV by notifying it on February 5 that it was terminating the affiliation agreement in July, that station switched to ABC on February 23, prompting WJMN to change to CBS three weeks early (and be fed CBS programs from the control room in Green Bay).

WFRV would be unaffected by the 1995 switch that saw WLUK-TV and WGBA-TV swap affiliations. The station was the first in Green Bay to launch a digital television signal, in 2002.

Spinoff to Liberty Media
In April 2007, Liberty Media (a media company unrelated to The Liberty Corporation and a spin-off of former cable television company TCI) completed an exchange transaction with CBS Corporation pursuant to which Liberty Media exchanged 7.6 million shares of CBS Class B common stock valued at $239 million for a subsidiary of CBS that held WFRV and WJMN and approximately $170 million in cash. As part of the transaction, Liberty Media acquired WFRV and WJMN, becoming the only over-the-air television properties to be owned by the company.

WFRV-TV shut down its analog signal, over VHF channel 5, at midnight (occurring within a commercial break during The Late Late Show with Craig Ferguson) on February 17, 2009, the original target date in which full-power television stations in the United States were to transition from analog to digital broadcasts under federal mandate (which was later pushed back to June 12, 2009). The station's digital signal remained on its pre-transition UHF channel 39. Through the use of PSIP, digital television receivers display the station's virtual channel as its former VHF analog channel 5. As part of the SAFER Act, WFRV kept its analog signal on the air until March 3 to inform viewers of the digital television transition through a loop of public service announcements from the National Association of Broadcasters.

WFRV under Nexstar
On April 7, 2011, Nexstar Broadcasting Group announced it would acquire WFRV and WJMN-TV from Liberty Media. The $20 million deal was approved by the FCC on June 28, 2011 and closed three days later on July 1, when Nexstar tapped Joseph Denk to become vice president and general manager of both stations; Denk replaced Perry Kidder, a 37-year employee of the station, who announced his retirement shortly after the sale was announced. The website URL and operations of WFRV and WJMN also changed to Nexstar's in-house format (they had been maintained by Broadcast Interactive Media since April 2010); in the case of WFRV, the station's main web address changed from "wfrv.com" to "wearegreenbay.com" (the former has been retained to discourage cybersquatting).

Nexstar also took moves to increase the local content of WJMN in the Upper Peninsula. A station that had long merely rebroadcast WFRV-TV's newscasts or maintained a minimal reporting and weather presence in northern Michigan, WJMN launched separate local newscasts at 6 and 11 pm on March 13, 2014. At that time, it rebranded as "Local 3", matching WFRV, which had taken on the "Local 5" moniker in January 2012.

On January 27, 2016, Media General announced that it had entered into a definitive agreement to be acquired by Nexstar. Because Media General owns WBAY, the new company was required to sell that station or WFRV to another owner. On June 3, 2016, it was announced that Nexstar would keep WFRV and its Quad Cities sister station WHBF-TV and sell Media General stations WBAY and its Quad Cities sister station KWQC-TV to Gray Television for $270 million.

The station launched their second subchannel on September 1, 2016, with Bounce TV as part of a group deal made between Bounce TV's parent company and Nexstar (Bounce was the only Katz network available to WFRV in Green Bay, as Scripps' WGBA-TV and WACY-TV carry Katz's other three networks as subchannels under a previous agreement, which will likely be maintained as Scripps purchased Katz at the start of October 2017).

On September 19, 2019, Nexstar closed their merger with Tribune Broadcasting, giving WFRV its first co-owned Milwaukee sister station in Fox affiliate WITI (channel 6), which already carries Locker Room from WFRV, though the pair-up was short-lived with Fox Television Stations re-acquiring WITI as part of Nexstar and Fox exchanging several stations in a number of NFC markets at the start of March 2020.

The station launched a third subchannel on April 24, 2020, affiliated with the True Crime Network.

On January 21, 2022, WJMN disaffiliated from CBS and became a MyNetworkTV affiliate, retaining previous syndicated programming, but also taking programming from Nexstar's classic television networks, Antenna TV and Rewind TV, to fill time where CBS programming formerly resided. The station also extended its existing 6 p.m. newscast to one hour, while moving their 11 p.m. newscast to a 10 p.m. hour. WZMQ (channel 19) acquired the CBS affiliation for its second digital subchannel.

Programming
Since September 2020, WFRV-TV has been one of the few American TV stations which does not carry any current-day syndicated programming on weekdays, with their entire schedule, outside a mid-afternoon hour block of Friends, being made up of local news or network content, and two late night paid programming slots leading in and out of a replay of the station's 10 p.m. newscast. Along with Friends, it has three other syndicated series on weekends; Magnum P.I. (2018) airs in late night on Saturday evenings, while the U.S. Farm Report and Hearst Television's Matter of Fact with Soledad O'Brien start the broadcast day on Saturday and Sunday mornings respectively, along with other various barter sports interview and outdoor programs in overnight timeslots. At times when a late-night weekend time slot cannot be filled, an automated loop of current conditions and the upcoming forecast from the station's weather computer is used to fill that time.

Sports programming
From 2003 to 2011, WFRV carried Green Bay Packers pre-season games and related official team programming, with the station branding as "Your Official Packers Station". Packer-related programming on WFRV has included Larry McCarren's Locker Room, a Monday night program which featured WFRV sports director and former Packer lineman Larry McCarren analyzing the previous day's Packer game and interviewing with the team's players and staff. In March 2012, the Packers entered into an agreement with Journal Broadcast Group to air Packers pre-season games and official programming on Journal-owned WGBA-TV (channel 26), making it the "official Packers station" in Green Bay;

News operation

WFRV-TV presently broadcasts 35½ hours of locally produced newscasts each week (with 5½ hours on weekdays, one hour on Saturdays and a half-hour on Sundays). In addition to its main studios on East Mason Street in Green Bay, WFRV also operates a Fox Valley bureau in Little Chute, located on Patriot Drive near US 41 freeway. The Valley bureau also has a second Doppler weather radar tower to provide extended radar coverage for the station's weather operation.

The audio feed of WFRV's 5 and 6 p.m. newscasts are simulcast on radio stations in the Fond du Lac–Oshkosh area (on WRPN, 1600 AM) as well as in the Marinette–Menominee area (on WHYB, 103.7 FM).

On June 23, 2011, after a six-month upgrade process, WFRV became the first station in the Green Bay market to begin broadcasting its local newscasts in high definition; the changeover to HD included an upgrade in the "Storm Team 5" weather technology, including real-time street-level radar. In January 2012, the station launched a new graphics package that is designed solely for 16:9 presentation in mind, cutting off portions of text in 4:3 presentation.

Beginning in September 2012, WFRV would greatly expand the number of hours of news content, including the addition of an hour-long afternoon newscast at 4 p.m. and the expansion of its 6 p.m. newscast from 30 minutes to one hour; the 6 p.m. newscast is reduced to 30 minutes during the NFL season on nights when WFRV airs Packers-related programming.

On December 31, 2012, the station's morning newscast Local 5 First News was retitled to Local 5 This Morning, with a new anchor team and a set used specifically for the morning program. The new version of the program takes cues from CBS This Morning, including a local-specific "Eye Opener" segment at the start of each half-hour.

On September 2, 2013, WFRV launched an hour-long local mid-morning program Local 5 Live!, which is a mix of advertorial and news content. Live! with Kelly and Michael, which had aired on the station in the 9 a.m. timeslot dating back to the late 1980s while still an ABC affiliate, moved to WLUK in the same timeslot.

Ratings
For most of its history, WFRV-TV's newscasts have been competitive with longtime leader WBAY-TV and runner-up WLUK-TV in most time slots although WFRV's newscasts have usually been in third place. However, since Nexstar purchased the station in mid-2011, the station has seen heavy turnover, with many veteran staff members, including Tammy Elliott, Dana Tyler, Olga Halaburda, Ryan Popkey and Larry McCarren departing the station for other opportunities. Anchors, especially on the weekends, are working longer shifts, and even doing both the morning and evening newscasts. As mentioned above, Nexstar has dropped most syndicated programming from the station on weekdays outside the 3 p.m. hour; outside of Oprah and Live!, the station has struggled since the late 1990s, often picking up short-lived talk and game shows which provided no long-terms ratings traction, and lost Wheel of Fortune (which aired leading into prime time) and Jeopardy! (aired at 3:30 p.m.) to WLUK-TV in 2005, despite having been distributed by a sister division when WFRV-TV was under CBS ownership.

Notable former on-air staff
Ross Becker-Buchberger – reporter (1975–1977; formerly anchor/reporter on several Los Angeles/San Diego stations, currently CEO of TVNewsMentor.com
Cindy Hsu – reporter (now at WCBS-TV)
Jay Johnson – anchor (1982–1987; later anchor at WLUK-TV from 1988 to 1996, later represented Wisconsin's 8th congressional district from 1997 to 1999, and served as director of U.S. Mint from 2000 to 2001; died October 17, 2009)
Steve Kmetko (1978–1979; later an E! host)
Larry McCarren – sports director (1988–2012; also former host of Larry McCarren's Locker Room; currently with the Green Bay Packers as a color commentator on radio alongside Wayne Larrivee)
Rob Stafford (later at Dateline NBC and now weeknight anchor at WMAQ-TV in Chicago)

Subchannels
The station's digital signal is multiplexed:

References

External links

CBS network affiliates
Bounce TV affiliates
Rewind TV affiliates
True Crime Network affiliates
Television channels and stations established in 1954
Television channels and stations established in 1955
FRV-TV
Nexstar Media Group
1955 establishments in Wisconsin
Former CBS Corporation subsidiaries
Former Liberty Media subsidiaries